Burlingame Dragons FC was an American soccer club based in Burlingame, California. Founded in 2014, the team played in the Premier Development League (PDL). The team was owned by Nick Swinmurn, founder of Zappos.com and a minority investor in the NBA's Golden State Warriors, and David Ebersman, former CFO of Facebook and Genentech. The team played its home games at Burlingame High School stadium. They were the developmental affiliate of the San Jose Earthquakes of Major League Soccer.

History 
Burlingame Dragons FC (BDFC) signed an affiliation agreement with the San Jose Earthquakes of Major League Soccer to be their official U23 team on December 9, 2014. The Dragons replaced the San Jose Earthquakes U23 squad that played in the PDL in 2014. Dana Taylor, former Earthquakes U23 and Cal State Stanislaus coach, was hired as the Dragons first head coach on January 27, 2015.

Burlingame Dragons FC's inaugural season in the PDL was capped by its first ever division title, a playoff win and an appearance in the Western Conference Final Four.

In their debut season, the Dragons started strong with wins over the Fresno Fuego and the Golden State Misioneros. On May 29, they suffered their only loss of the season with a 3–0 loss to Ventura County; however, they finished the season strong going 8–0–2 to take the Southwest Division title. In the Western Conference Championships, they avenged their only loss by defeating the Fusion in the first round (1–0) but then lost in the semi-finals to the Seattle Sounders FC U-23 1–0.

The Dragons also played in the 2015 Lamar Hunt U.S. Open Cup by inheriting the spot earned by the San Jose Earthquakes U23 team. They lost in overtime 2–1 to Sonoma County Sol in the first round.

The following season, Eric Bucchere replaced Taylor as head coach in 2016. After the Dragons advanced to the Western Conference semi-finals for the second consecutive year, Bucchere was promoted to an assistant coaching position with Reno 1868 FC of the United Soccer League (USL). Bucchere was then replaced by Joe Cannon.

In 2017, the Dragons won their first Open Cup game over El Farolito and even led future NASL champion San Francisco Deltas in the second round before falling 2–1. Matt Wiesenfarth finished second in the entire PDL with 13 goals in just 11 games, and the Dragons were the only team all season that the eventual Western Conference champion FC Golden State Force failed to defeat in two tries (0–0, 1–1).

Founder Nick Swinmurn had made a bid to obtain a USL team following the 2017 season but ultimately withdrew it. At the same time, he announced he would also cease operations of the Dragons.

Year-by-year

Honors
 Premier Development League
 Southwest Division Champions: 2015

Head coaches
 Dana Taylor (2015)
 Eric Bucchere (2016)
 Joe Cannon (2017)

Players signed/drafted by Major League Soccer clubs

 Ty Thompson (2016, San Jose Earthquakes) ^
 Nick Lima (2017, San Jose Earthquakes) ‡
 Brian Nana-Sinkam (2017, Seattle Sounders FC) ^
 Josh Smith (2017, New England Revolution) ^
 Christian Thierjung (2017, San Jose Earthquakes) ^
 Brian Wright (2017, New England Revolution) ^
 Tristan Blackmon (2018, LAFC) ^
 Corey Baird (2018, Real Salt Lake) ‡
 Tomas Hilliard-Arce (2018, LA Galaxy) ^
 JT Marcinkowski (2018, San Jose Earthquakes) ‡
 Josh Morton (2018, Chicago Fire) ^
 Danny Musovski (2018, San Jose Earthquakes) ^
 Kevin Partida (2018, San Jose Earthquakes) ^
 Drew Skundrich (2018, LA Galaxy) ^
 Amir Bashti (2019, Atlanta United FC) ^
 Camden Riley (2019, Sporting KC) ^
 Robbie Mertz (2019, Colorado Rapids) ^
 Tanner Beason (2020, San Jose Earthquakes) ^
 Remi Prieur (2020, Columbus Crew) ^

‡ Homegrown Signing

^ Selected in MLS SuperDraft

References

Association football clubs established in 2014
Association football clubs disestablished in 2017
San Jose Earthquakes
USL League Two teams
2014 establishments in California
2017 disestablishments in California
Burlingame, California